Wayne Inouye (born 1953) formerly served as Gateway's president and CEO. Inouye announced his departure from Gateway on February 9, 2006.

Biography 
Inouye became president and CEO of privately held eMachines in 2001, where he quickly turned the company into one of the fastest-growing, most efficient PC companies in the United States. eMachines was acquired by Gateway in March 2004.

Inouye had several decades of senior executive experience, first at The Good Guys!, where he worked for 9 years, and then as senior VP of computer merchandising at Best Buy, where he worked from 1995 to 2001.

He serves as the consumer merchandising & channel advisor of Fuhu, Inc. and executive officer of Fugoo, LLC.

References 

Living people
1953 births
American computer businesspeople
American people of Japanese descent
20th-century American businesspeople
Gateway, Inc.